St Sebastian between St Roch and St Peter is a fragment of a fresco by Perugino, painted around 1478 in the church of Santa Maria Assunta in Cerqueto, Italy. It was his first depiction of Saint Sebastian, a subject to which he would frequently return. To the left is St Roch and to the right St Peter.

It was originally dated and signed "PETRUS PERUSINUS P[INXIT] / A[NNO DOMINI] MCCCCLVIII" (Peter of Perugia painted [this] / Year of Our Lord 1478). In 1478 he was back in Umbria after a period in Andrea del Verrocchio's studio in Florence. He began to receive important commissions, whose success was noted by pope Sixtus IV, who summoned him to Rome. That same year, the Confraternity of Mary Magdalene (confraternita della Maddalena) summoned him to Cerqueto, near Perugia, where he painted a cycle of frescoes - this is the only surviving fragment from the cycle.

Bibliography
  Vittoria Garibaldi, Perugino, in Pittori del Rinascimento, Scala, Florence, 2004 

Church frescos in Italy
Paintings by Pietro Perugino
1478 paintings
Perugino
Perugino
Paintings of Saint Roch